Adriano Guarnieri (18 November 1914 – 5 June 1983) was an Italian alpine skier who competed in the 1936 Winter Olympics. In 1936 he finished 17th in the alpine skiing combined event.

References

External links
 

1914 births
1983 deaths
Italian male alpine skiers
Olympic alpine skiers of Italy
Alpine skiers at the 1936 Winter Olympics
20th-century Italian people